Patrick Nordström (1870–1929) was a Swedish-Danish ceramist. He worked for the Royal Copenhagen Porcelain Manufactury from 1912 to 1922.

Biography
Patrick Nordstrom was born in Sweden in 1870. He came to Denmark in 1900 where he established a workshop in Islev outside Copenhagen. He worked for the Royal Porcelain Manufactury from 1912 to 1922 where he established its production of stoneware.

Style
Nordstrom developed a number of new Ceramic glazes, including Gundestrup, Sung and Ox Blood. He was inspired by East Asian and French stoneware, he created ahis works represent a fine balance between simple shapes and richly varied glazes of high artistic quality.

Exhibitions
Nordstrom's works were featured in an exhibition at the National Museum in Stockholm from 16 March - 8 April 1956 and at the Danish Design Museum in Copenhagen from 12 April -27 May 1956.

Further reading
 Bodelsen, Merete : Patrick Nordström 1870 - 1929 (123 pages with 42 illustrations),

References

1870 births
1929 deaths
20th-century Danish ceramists
Swedish ceramists
Swedish emigrants to Denmark